The Alberta Human Rights Commission (AHRC) is a quasi-judicial human rights body in Alberta, Canada, created by the provincial government.

The Commission was established under and tasked with administering the Alberta Human Rights Act (AHRA). Its mandate is to reduce discrimination in Alberta "through the resolution and settlement of complaints of discrimination, and through human rights tribunal and court hearings." In relation to complaint resolution and settlement, the primary purpose of the tribunals is adjudicative.

It is headed by the Chief of the Commission and Tribunals, who is tasked with informing Alberta's Minister of Justice and Solicitor General of human rights issues, as well as providing guidance to Commission members regarding such functions as their tribunal hearings, and to the Commission director regarding the overall objective of the Commission. Both the Chief and Commission members are appointed by Order in Council.

The AHRC differs from the Canadian Human Rights Commission (CHRC), which deals with complaints relating to treatment by the federal government or a federally-regulated business.

Organization 
The functions of the Commission are laid out in the Alberta Human Rights Act. In particular, section 16(1) states that the function of the Commission is:(a) to forward the principle that all persons are equal in dignity, rights and responsibilities without regard to race, religious beliefs, colour, gender, gender identity, gender expression, physical disability, mental disability, age, ancestry, place of origin, marital status, source of income, family status or sexual orientation,

(b) to promote awareness and appreciation of and respect for the multicultural heritage of Alberta society,

(c) to promote an environment in which all Albertans can participate in and contribute to the cultural, social, economic and political life of Alberta,

(d) to encourage all sectors of Alberta society to provide equality of opportunity,

(e) to research, develop and conduct educational programs designed to eliminate discriminatory practices related to race, religious beliefs, colour, gender, gender identity, gender expression, physical disability, mental disability, age, ancestry, place of origin, marital status, source of income, family status or sexual orientation,

(f) to promote an understanding of, acceptance of an compliance with this Act,

(g) to encourage and coordinate both public and private human rights programs and activities, and

(h) to advise the Minister on matters related to this Act.

Members and leadership 
The Commission is headed by the Chief of the Commission and Tribunals, who is tasked with informing Alberta's Minister of Justice and Solicitor General of human rights issues, as well as providing guidance to Commission members regarding such functions as their tribunal hearings, and to the Commission director regarding the overall objective of the Commission. Section 15 of the Alberta Human Rights Act provides that the Chief and members are appointed by the Lieutenant Governor in Council.

The current Chief of the Commission and Tribunals is Kathryn Oviatt, who was appointed in November 2022. Prior to October 2009, the position was simply referred to as the Chief Commissioner. Previous chiefs include:

 Dr. Evaristus A. Oshionebo – September 2022 – November 2022
 Collin May – July 2022 – September 2022
 Kathryn Oviatt – January 2022 – July 2022
 Michael Gottheil – August 2018 – January 2022
 William D. McFetridge (acting) – August 2017 – August 2018
 Robert A. Philp – July 1, 2014 – June 30, 2017
 David Blair Mason – 2009–2014
 Brenda F. Scragg (acting) – 2008–2009
 Charlach Mackintosh – 1994–2008
 Jack O'Neil – 1993–1994
 Fil B. Fraser – 1989–1992
 Stan Scudder – 1986–1989
 Marlene Antonio – 1981–1986
 Bob Lundrigan – 1979–1981
 Max Wyman – 1973–1979

, members of the Commission are:

 Nduka Ahanonu
 Sandra Badejo
 Faraz Bawa
 Doris Bonora, K.C.
 Samuel Crowfoot
 Cynthia Dickins
 Jessica Gill
 Teresa Haykowsky 
 Duncan Marsden
 Ali Memon  
 D. Jean Munn, K.C.
 Evaristus Oshionebo
 Kathryn Oviatt
 Erika Ringseis
 Karen Scott
 Wilma Shim
 Salimah Walji-Shivji, K.C.
 Nathalie Whyte

Tribunal
The quasi-judicial Tribunal office is the independent adjudicative arm of the Alberta Human Rights Commission. Members of the Tribunal are neither employees of the Government of Alberta or the Commission; they are private citizens appointed by the Lieutenant Governor in Council.

Controversial decisions

Mihaly v The Association of Professional Engineers and Geoscientists of Alberta
Since 1999, Ladislav Mihaly, who trained as an engineer in Czechoslovakia in the 1970s, has sought accreditation as an engineer in Alberta, but the Association of Professional Engineers and Geoscientists of Alberta (APEGA) said that he did not meet its requirements. He refused to submit to any of the technical examinations but did take a required ethics examination—and failed it, twice. Almost a quarter of Alberta's engineers are immigrants who submitted to the same examinations that Mihaly refused or failed. In 2008, he took his case to the Alberta Human Rights Commission, which ruled in February 2014 that APEGA must pay Mihaly $10,000, provide him with a personal mentor and form a committee to re-evaluate his credentials. APEGA successfully appealed the decision.

Lund v Boissoin

On July 18, 2002, Dr. Darren Lund, a professor at the University of Calgary, filed a complaint with the Alberta Human Rights Commission against Reverend Stephen Boissoin and the Concerned Christian Coalition.

Boisson had letter published in the Red Deer Advocate that stated, "Where homosexuality flourishes, all manner of wickedness abounds" and "Homosexual rights activists and those that defend them, are just as immoral as the pedophiles, drug dealers and pimps that plague our communities." Lund's complaint alleged that Boisson's letter constituted discrimination on the basis of sexual orientation, as prohibited by Alberta's Human Rights, Citizenship and Multiculturalism Act.

A one-member Alberta Human Rights Panel accepted Lund's arguments that the letter was "likely to expose homosexuals to hatred and/or contempt." The Canadian Civil Liberties Association intervened in the case, condemning the views expressed in the letter but arguing they should not be subject to legal sanction.

On May 30, 2008, the Alberta Human Rights Panel ordered Boissoin and the Concerned Christian Coalition to refrain from publishing future disparaging remarks about homosexuals and provide Lund with a written apology and in $5,000 damages.

On December 3, 2009, the Court of Queen's Bench of Alberta overturned the decision of the Alberta Human Rights Panel. The Court found that the contents of the letter did not violate the Alberta Human Rights Act, and that the remedies that had been imposed were either unlawful or unconstitutional. The Court also identified "troubling aspects of the process leading to the decision of the Panel," including the inclusion of the Concerned Christian Coalition as a respondent. In October 2012, the Court of Appeal of Alberta upheld the decision and agreed with the lower court that Boissoin's letter was "a polemic on a matter of public interest and does not qualify as reaching the extreme limits... to expose persons to hatred or contempt," within the meaning of the Alberta Human Rights Act.

See also 

 List of Canadian tribunals

Federal
Canadian Human Rights Commission
Canadian Human Rights Tribunal
BC

British Columbia Human Rights Tribunal
British Columbia Human Rights Code

Ontario
Ontario Human Rights Commission
Human Rights Tribunal of Ontario
Quebec

 Quebec Human Rights Commission
 Human Rights Tribunal of Quebec

Other

 Manitoba Human Rights Commission
 Nova Scotia Human Rights Commission
 Saskatchewan Human Rights Commission

References

External links
Alberta Human Rights Commission
Tribunal decisions released after January 1, 2000 — via CanLII

Alberta law
Human Rights Commission
Human rights organizations based in Canada